Allomymar is a little-known monotypic genus of chalcid wasps belonging to the family Aphelinidae. The only species within the genus is Allomymar taitae and it is possible that Allomymar is synonymous with Encarsia.

References

Aphelinidae
Monotypic Hymenoptera genera